Azara's night monkey (Aotus azarae), also known as the southern night monkey, is a night monkey species from South America. It is found in Argentina, Bolivia, Brazil, Peru and Paraguay. The species is monogamous, with the males providing a large amount of parental care. It is named after Spanish naturalist Félix de Azara. Although primarily nocturnal, some populations of Azara's night monkey are unique among night monkeys in being active both day and night. The species is listed as Least Concern on the IUCN Red List.

Taxonomy 

There are three subspecies of Azara's night monkey.
 Aotus azarae azarae
 Bolivian night monkey, Aotus azarae boliviensis
 Feline night monkey, Aotus azarae infulatus

Physical characteristics 

Due to a lack of data body size and weight measurements of Azara's night monkey have been estimated from a small number of wild samples. Its gestation period is about 133 days. The lifespan for Azara's night monkey is unknown, but the captive life span for members of the genus Aotus is believed to be 20 years.

Behavior and ecology 

Azara's night monkey is a monogamous species, with the male remaining present to raise the offspring and provide food. The offspring will only stay with its family until two to three years of age and then will disperse to begin a family of its own. There is very little sexual dimorphism in this species.

Azara's night monkey is primarily a frugivore, but also will eat things such as leaves, flowers, and insects. One of the main advantages of being a nocturnal animal is that there is greatly reduced competition from diurnal animals.

Azara's night monkey spends its life in trees and becomes more active when the moon is brighter, tending to keep to its well-known paths. However, uniquely among night monkeys, populations of Azara's night monkey from the Gran Chaco are active both day and night. Azara's night monkey can be found sleeping in groups of between 2 and 5 others in trees. The average group size is about 3 monkeys, consisting of an adult pair and their offspring. It leaps from tree to tree but also moves quadrupedally throughout the forest.

Habitat and distribution 
Azara's night monkey is found in northern Argentina, Bolivia, central Brazil, Paraguay and far southeastern Peru. Its range includes the southern Amazon, ranging into more open habitats such as the Gran Chaco. Aotus a. azarae is found in gallery forest and semi-deciduous forest, A. a. infulatus is found in humid lowland forest and gallery forest, and A. a. infulatus is found in various forest types.

Conservation 
Azara's night monkey is widespread and believed to be overall fairly common. It is present in several reserves. The species is not considered threatened, but is declining locally due to habitat loss.

References

External links 
Aotus azarae information at ThePrimata.
Aotus: The Owl Monkey's Natural History at MD Anderson.

Azara's night monkey
Mammals of Brazil
Mammals of Bolivia
Mammals of Argentina
Mammals of Peru
Mammals of Paraguay
Azara's night monkey
Taxa named by Alexander von Humboldt